Samadhi Zendejas (born December 27, 1995), also known simply as Samadhi and professionally as Samadhi Zendejas, is a Mexican actress and performer. She got her first role as Amaya on Atrevete a Soñar.

Personal life 
Samadhi currently attends classes at Televisa's acting school, Centro de Educación Artística (CEA) in Mexico City.

In 2009, she got her first acting role in Atrevete a Soñar, playing student, Amaya. She also was in a relationship with the actor Alejandro Speitzer, who played the role of Raymundo. She also lent her voice for the show's CDs. She won the award for best female revelation of 2010.

In 2010, she starred in an episode of La rosa de Guadalupe. She was also a part of Mujeres Asesinas 3. She starred in the episode Marta, manipuladora alongside Aislinn Derbez, Manuel Landeta, and Lorena Meritano.

In 2017, Samadhi starred as Jenni Rivera in Mariposa de Barrio for 34 episodes. 

Samadhi is the oldest of three siblings: Adriano Zendejas, a Mexican actor, and Dassana Zendejas, Mexican actress as well.

Samadhi had a romantic relationship with Jorge Coch, brother of famous actress Jessica Coch , this relationship ended in May.

Filmography

Awards

Premios TVyNovelas

References

External links 

 
 

Living people
1994 births
Mexican television actresses
Mexican telenovela actresses
Actresses from Mexico City